Alucita canariensis is a moth of the family Alucitidae. It is found on the Canary Islands.

References

Moths described in 1994
Alucitidae
Moths of Africa